Michel Pierre Plasse (June 1, 1948 – December 30, 2006) was a Canadian professional ice hockey goaltender.

Playing career
Born in Montreal, Quebec, Plasse played in the National Hockey League (NHL) from 1970 to 1982 after being the first overall draft pick in the 1968 NHL Amateur Draft. During his NHL career, he played for the St. Louis Blues (1970–71), Montreal Canadiens (1973–74), Kansas City Scouts (1974–75), Pittsburgh Penguins (1975–76), Colorado Rockies (1976–80), and Quebec Nordiques (1981–1982). 

Despite being a first draft pick, Plasse played just sixty minutes in goal for his first club, St. Louis, playing mainly for their affiliate, the Kansas City Blues of the Central Hockey League. On February 21, 1971, the Oklahoma City Blazers were trailing the Blues 2–1 and decided to pull their goaltender. Plasse scored on the open net and became the first professional goalie in the history of the game to score a goal.

Plasse returned to Kansas City as the first pick of the NHL Scouts in the 1974 expansion draft. Plasse attended the draft at Montreal's Queen Elizabeth Hotel.

"All year long, I said I was going to Kansas City. I used to sing that in the locker room to my teammates, 'Kansas City, here I come,'" Plasse told Jay Greenberg of the Kansas City Star. (Icing on the Plains: The Rough Ride of Kansas City's NHL Scouts, pp. 41-42) 

In total, Plasse clocked up 16,760 regular season minutes on ice in 299 games, conceding 1,058 goals with an average of 3.79 goals per game. He earned 2 shutouts, both for Pittsburgh in 1975–76. He played 4 Stanley Cup playoff games, conceding 9 goals in 195 minutes at a rate of 2.77, including 1 shutout. Plasse won the Stanley Cup with Montreal in 1973.

Death
Plasse died in La Visitation-de-l'Île-Dupas, Quebec of a heart attack on December 30, 2006.

Career statistics

Regular season and playoffs

References

External links

1948 births
2006 deaths
Binghamton Whalers players
Canadian ice hockey goaltenders
Cleveland Barons (1937–1973) players
Colorado Rockies (NHL) players
Drummondville Rangers players
Fort Worth Texans players
French Quebecers
Hampton Gulls (AHL) players
Hershey Bears players
Ice hockey people from Montreal
Kansas City Blues players
Kansas City Scouts players
Montreal Canadiens draft picks
Montreal Canadiens players
National Hockey League first-overall draft picks
Nova Scotia Voyageurs players
Pittsburgh Penguins players
Quebec Nordiques players
St. Louis Blues players
Stanley Cup champions
National Hockey League first-round draft picks